A Steiner point (named after Jakob Steiner) may refer to:
Steiner point (computational geometry), a point added in solving a geometric optimization problem to make its solution better
Steiner point (triangle), a certain point on the circumcircle of a given triangle
One of 20 points associated with a given set of six points on a conic; see

See also
Steiner tree problem, an algorithmic problem of finding extra Steiner points to add to a point set to reduce the cost of connecting the points
The median of three vertices in a median graph, the solution to the Steiner tree problem for those three vertices
The Fermat point of a triangle, the solution to the Steiner tree problem for the three vertices of the triangle